VIVA College is an educational institute run by Late Shri Vishnu Waman Thakur Charitable Trust, established in 2001 in Virar, Maharashtra, India, affiliated to the University of Mumbai. It offers under-graduate courses in Science, Commerce and Arts. Its sister colleges, run by the same trust offer under-graduate courses in Law, Engineering and post-graduate courses in Management and Information Technology.

History
The Vishnu Waman Thakur Charitable Trust presided by Hitendra Thakur, the  Member of Legislative Assembly from Vasai (Vidhan Sabha constituency), established the Utkarsha Junior College in 1991 to promote the cause of higher education in Virar and its adjoining rural area predominantly inhabited by Adivasi population.

The college was affiliated to Maharashtra State Board of Secondary and Higher Secondary Education. Later, in the year 2000–2001, the VIVA College was established with affiliation to the University of Mumbai offering undergraduate courses in Arts, Commerce and Science.

It started an undergraduate course in commerce with an intake of just 148 students. By 2011, it not only has all the 3 basic faculties of Arts, Commerce and Science, but also offers career oriented professional courses such as - Bachelor of Multimedia, BMS, Bachelor of Science (Information Technology), Bachelor of Science (Computer Science), Bachelor of Science (Bio-Technology), Bachelor of Commerce in Accounts, Finance and Banking & Insurance alongside a course in Hotel Management.

Under the name of VIVA IMS, the trust has now started the Master of Management Studies (MMS), a post graduate degree affiliated to University of Mumbai.

Current situation

Presently, the approximate total enrollments in the college stands around 7000, faculty strength of 150, non-teaching staff of 50. All courses are conducted on no-grant basis with financial support from the trust only.

The College Library
The VIVA College Library contains over 15000 text and Reference books on various subjects for Junior and Senior College students, as well as rare volumes and manuscripts. It has many rare books not available in similar libraries. The library subscribes to over 64 magazines including journals and 15 news papers . It has a spacious and an airy reading hall, which provides seating accommodation for 150 students at a time .

References

Colleges in India
Universities and colleges in Maharashtra
Affiliates of the University of Mumbai
Education in Vasai-Virar
Educational institutions established in 2000
2000 establishments in Maharashtra